Santiago Brunelli Llorca (born 15 May 1998) is a Uruguayan footballer who plays as a defender for River Plate in the Uruguayan Primera División.

References

External links
Profile at FOX Sports

1998 births
Living people
Plaza Colonia players
Club Atlético River Plate (Montevideo) players
Uruguayan Primera División players
Uruguayan Segunda División players
Uruguayan footballers
Association football defenders